Ludwig Maximilian Erwin von Scheubner-Richter (Lettish: Ludvigs Rihters) ( – 9 November 1923) was a Baltic German political activist and an influential early member of the Nazi Party. 

Scheubner-Richter was a Baltic German from Russia and fought against the Russian Revolution of 1905 before serving in the Imperial German Army during World War I, witnessing and producing documentation of the Armenian genocide. He was leader of the Aufbau Vereinigung and a leading ideologist of Nazism at the beginning of the Interwar period. Scheubner-Richter became a key influence and close associate of Adolf Hitler, and an activist of the Nazi Party instrumental in securing financing for its early stages.

Scheubner-Richter was killed during the Beer Hall Putsch in November 1923 and part of Hitler's Mein Kampf was dedicated to him. He was elevated to status of Blutzeuge ("blood witness") and national hero upon the founding of Nazi Germany in 1933.

Early life
Ludwig Maximilian Erwin Richter was born on 21 January 1884 in Riga, Russian Empire, the son of a German musician and a Baltic German mother. Richter lived a large part of his early life in the Governorate of Livonia, and studied chemistry at the Riga Polytechnical Institute from 1904 to 1906. Richter joined a pro-government private army during the Russian Revolution of 1905 and married Mathilde von Scheubner, the daughter of the owner of a factory he was tasked with protecting. Mathilde was 19 years his senior and a noblewoman. After the conclusion of the revolution in 1907, Richter moved to the German city of Munich, Bavaria, where he continued his studies and became a Doktoringenieur. In 1912, Scheubner was prefixed to his own name upon adoption by one of his wife's relatives, an old German form of having one's lineage ennobled.

World War I and Armenian genocide
On 10 August 1914, shortly after the outbreak of World War I, Scheubner-Richter joined the Bavarian Army as a volunteer and was assigned to the 7th Chevauleger Regiment on the Western Front. However, Scheubner-Richter was relocated to the Eastern Front from November 1914, where Germany was fighting the Imperial Russian Army, after one of his superiors discovered his knowledge of the Russian language.

In December 1914 Scheubner-Richter became the German vice consul of Erzerum, Turkey, succeeding Dr. Paul Schwarz – this appointment was a disguise for a secret operation by the Germans to sabotage the Russian oil fields in the Caucasus, under the belief it would cause the Russian war effort to grind to a halt. The Germans hoped to infiltrate during an Ottoman offensive on Russian fortifications in Kars, but the operation was cancelled when the Ottomans were not as successful as expected. Russian resistance made infiltration of the Caucasus impossible, and Scheubner-Richter remained working as a consul in Turkey for the remainder of the war. While holding that post, Scheubner-Richter also documented the Turkish massacres of Armenians as part of the Armenian genocide. At the time, he was considered one of the most outspoken individuals against the deportations and subsequent massacres of Armenians. Scheubner-Richter believed that the deportations were based on "racial hatred" and that none could survive such a journey. Scheubner-Richter concluded that the deportations were a policy of "annihilation". In the meeting, Talaat Pasha claimed that the deportations of the Armenians were for their own safety. Nevertheless, on 15 June 1915, Talaat ordered the protection of the deported Armenians in Elazığ, Bitlis and Diyarbakır, explaining this order by the fact that a convoy of Armenian deportees coming from Erzurum had been assaulted. This didn't stop the deportations in Erzurum, though, and by August 1915, Scheubner-Richter acknowledged that there were no Armenians present in the district of his consulate. In October, he was succeeded by Friedrich-Werner Graf von der Schulenburg. Von Scheubner-Richter did manage to save individual Armenians, but his interventions in Constantinople and Berlin were ineffective. As the marginal notes to his letter in the Embassy of Constantinople show, his behaviour towards the Armenians was even regarded as unworldly and not appropriate to the political situation.

After the war, Scheubner-Richter returned to the Baltic in the midst of the Russian Civil War that had begun after the October Revolution in November 1917. He was involved in the counter-revolutionary activity and joined the Baltic Freikorps, an extension of the Freikorps in the Baltic States.

Nazi activity
In 1918, Scheubner-Richter and Alfred Rosenberg moved to Germany from Russia with the returning German Army and became members of the Aufbau Vereinigung (Reconstruction Organisation), a far-right conspiratorial organisation composed of White Russian émigrés and early Nazis. The Aufbau Vereinigung sought to overthrow the governments of Weimar Germany and the Soviet Union to install authoritarian far-right regimes, and its members committed a number of terrorist acts, including the assassination of German Foreign Minister Walther Rathenau. In March 1920 Scheubner-Richter took part in the Kapp Putsch which necessitated his fleeing to Munich, where he became a member of the Nazi Party. He had extensive contacts with potential financial contributors and soon became a leading personality in the party. The Aufbau Vereinigung under Scheubner-Richter's leadership has been considered one of the major early influences of Adolf Hitler and the NSDAP, of which Scheubner-Richter and Rosenberg became prominent members. Scheubner-Richter met Hitler in October 1920, soon becoming his foreign policy adviser and a financier identifying other sources of income for the party. 

Scheubner-Richter was particularly noteworthy for his extensive contacts with conservative and right-wing circles in Germany, including the famous World War I general Erich Ludendorff. Scheubner-Richter used his financial and political ties to court the support of the German elite, including industrialists, high ecclesiastical posts, aristocrats such as the Prussian Junkers and the Wittelsbachs, and wealthy Russian émigrés. Scheubner-Richter appealed to exiled Russian monarchists across Europe, who hoped, through support from the NSDAP, to influence German policy in the direction of eliminating the Soviet Union and re-establishing the Tsar in Russia. These efforts generated considerable financial resources for the NSDAP.

At the end of September 1923, Scheubner-Richter provided Adolf Hitler with a lengthy plan for revolution, writing: "The national revolution must not precede the seizure of political power; the seizure of the state's police power constitutes the promise for the national revolution" and "to lay hands on the state police power in a way that is at least outwardly legal".

Death
Scheubner-Richter was a participant in the Beer Hall Putsch, marching on the Feldherrnhalle in Munich along with two thousand NSDAP members. On 9 November 1923, Scheubner-Richter, walking arm-in-arm with Hitler, was shot in the lungs and died instantly as he and others marched toward armed guards during the Putsch. Hitler was brought down and his right shoulder was dislocated as Scheubner-Richter's body fell after being shot dead. 

Scheubner-Richter was the only "first-tier" Nazi leader to die during the Beer Hall Putsch, and of all the early party members who died in the Putsch, Hitler claimed Scheubner-Richter to be the only "irreplaceable loss". The first part of Hitler's book, Mein Kampf, is dedicated to Scheubner-Richter and the other fifteen men who died in the Putsch. The Aufbau Vereinigung declined rapidly after Scheubner-Richter's death, and its increasing integration with the NSDAP saw most of its Russian membership abandon the organization over the growing notions of anti-Slavism and Lebensraum.

In 1933, the establishment of Nazi Germany led to Scheubner-Richter being venerated as a national hero. Scheubner-Richter was one of the most prominent Blutzeuge, a term for Nazis killed before the NSDAP's rise to power who were considered martyrs of the Nazi movement. Scheubner-Richter's name was featured on a panel attached to the Feldherrnhalle with the names of the Nazis who died in the Beer Hall Putsch. The panel was guarded by an honor guard of the SS, and every passer-by was expected to perform the Hitler salute. Numerous streets in towns across Germany were renamed after Scheubner-Richter. In 1935, the Ehrentempel ("Honor Temples") were erected at Königsplatz in Munich to house the sarcophagi of Scheubner-Richter and the other Blutzeuge that died in the Beer Hall Putsch.

See also
Witnesses and testimonies of the Armenian genocide
Dietrich Eckart
Alter Kämpfer

References

External links
 Report On Armenian Genocide by Eye Witness, Scheubner-Richter, German Consule/Administrator in Erzerum.

1884 births
1923 deaths
Politicians from Riga
People from the Governorate of Livonia
Baltic-German people
Nazi Party officials
Witnesses of the Armenian genocide
Nazis who participated in the Beer Hall Putsch
20th-century Freikorps personnel
Kapp Putsch participants
Deaths by firearm in Germany
Russian anti-communists
German anti-communists
German monarchists
German Army personnel of World War I